Qarsau Island is one of the many uninhabited Canadian arctic islands in Qikiqtaaluk Region, Nunavut.

Other islands in the immediate vicinity include Aubrey Island, Beveridge Island, Bishop Island, Cairn Island, Coffin Island, Crimmins Island, Emerick Island, Faris Island, Hill Island, Jenvey Island, Kudlago Island, Long Island, Mair Island, McLaren Island, Monument Island, Ptarmigan Island, Sale Island, Sybil Island, and Thompson Island.

References 

Uninhabited islands of Qikiqtaaluk Region
Islands of Baffin Island
Islands of Frobisher Bay